Mierzęcin  is a village in the administrative district of Gmina Dobiegniew, within Strzelce-Drezdenko County, Lubusz Voivodeship, in western Poland.

The village has a population of 350.

Notable people 
 Friedrich Siegmund von Waldow (1682-1743), Prussian General

References

Villages in Strzelce-Drezdenko County